Karl August Ramsay  (10 November 1791 in Kuopio - 8 December 1855 in Helsinki) was a Finnish politician. He was a member of the Senate of Finland.

1791 births
1855 deaths
People from Kuopio
Finnish people of Scottish descent
Finnish politicians
Finnish senators